For a list of all Rochdale players with a Wikipedia article, see :Category:Rochdale A.F.C. players, and for the current squad see Rochdale A.F.C.#Current squad.
This is a list of footballers who have played for Rochdale A.F.C. who have played 100 or more senior matches for the club.
 
Appearances and goals are for first-team competitive matches only. Wartime matches are regarded as unofficial and are excluded, as are matches from the abandoned 1939–40 season.

References 
 Post-war Football League Player statistics
 Rochdale players: appearance and goals stats (for players with debuts between 1921–22 and 1946–47) at upthedale.nl
 Rochdale career Lge/FA Cup/Lge Cup stats for players at the club in 1970-71 - Bob's 1970–71 Footballers
 Rochdale manager stats at upthedale.nl
 Soccerbase stats (use Search for...on left menu and select 'Players' drop down)
 English National Football Archive
 
 Appearances, goals and club years stats at enfa.co.uk

Players
 
Rochdale
Association football player non-biographical articles